The John R. Wooden Classic was an annual college basketball event hosted by the Honda Center in Anaheim, California. Named after coach John Wooden, the event featured a December neutral-site doubleheader until its final two editions, which were single games.

The event was merged in 2013 with the DirecTV Classic, an eight-team, three-day tournament, to form a new event, the Wooden Legacy.

History
The John R. Classic was founded in 1994 by Atherton Communications in honor of the former Hall of Fame Purdue player and UCLA head coach John Wooden. The inaugural event was nationally televised by NBC Sports and featured four top 10 teams, including the first meeting in 20 years between UCLA and Kentucky, when they played for the 1975 NCAA Championship (won by UCLA), which marked John Wooden's 10th national title and the final game of his illustrious coaching career.

The Wooden Classic grew to include a charity golf tournament and coaches banquet, which raised over $1 million for Children's Hospital and Special Olympics, two of Coach Wooden's favorite charities. The 1998 and 1999 events also included the John R. Wooden Classic High School Invitational, which featured future NBA players, Tyson Chandler (Dominguez), Keith Bogans (DeMatha Catholic), Joe Forte (DeMatha Catholic) and Casey Jacobsen (Glendora).

The Classic was historically a high-profile doubleheader invitational event in early December. After Wooden died in 2010, it became a single game in January in the 2011–12 season due to scheduling conflicts and the transition to the event's new owners, Honda Center. The classic returned to December in the 2012–13 season, but was again a single game. Since its inception, the games were played in Anaheim, California, at the Honda Center, known earlier as the Arrowhead Pond of Anaheim. In June 2013, the Wooden Classic merged with the DirecTV Classic to form the Wooden Legacy, a three-day, eight-team event.

Results

All-time team records

References

1994 establishments in California
2012 disestablishments in California
Basketball competitions in Anaheim, California
College men's basketball competitions in the United States
College basketball competitions
Recurring sporting events established in 1994
Recurring sporting events disestablished in 2012